The Ernest Hemingway Cottage, also known as Windemere, was the boyhood summer home of author Ernest Hemingway, on Walloon Lake in Michigan. It was declared a National Historic Landmark in 1968.

History
In about 1898, Dr. Clarence Hemingway and his wife Grace Hall Hemingway purchased four lots at this site on the shore of Walloon Lake. In 1899, they identified a location to construct a cottage, which Grace designed. In 1900, the couple spent $400 to have this cottage constructed on the site, which they dubbed "Windemere." The family spent summers at the cottage; Ernest Hemingway, born in 1899, spent every summer here from 1900 - 1920, save 1918. In 1904, they added a kitchen, connected to the main house with a breezeway. Later, a smaller "annex" was constructed to provide more bedrooms.

In 1921, Hemingway and Hadley Richardson honeymooned in the cottage. Hemingway returned to the cottage only once more in his life, in the early 1950s.

After his mother died, Hemingway was willed the cottage. Although he did not visit, he retained ownership until his own death in 1961. At his request, Hemingway's widow signed over ownership of the cottage to his younger sister Madelaine, who used it until her own death. It later passed to Hemingway's nephew, Ernie Mainland, but he died in 2021 and was survived by his wife Judy and their son Ken.

Description
The Ernest Hemingway Cottage is a single-story frame structure with a gabled roof and white clapboard siding measuring 20 feet by 40 feet. The main section of the cottage contains the sleeping and living rooms, along with a bathroom and utility closet. A smaller section contains the kitchen; a breezeway, originally screened but now enclosed, connects the two sides. The interior is covered with unpainted clapboard. The kitchen has been modernized.

A smaller "annex" building, constructed a few years after the main cottage, stands a few yards away. A modern garage is located behind the cottage.

In literature
Hemingway used the northern Michigan setting in a number of his works, most featuring his character Nick Adams. The cottage appears in "The Doctor and the Doctor's Wife," "Ten Indians," "The Indians Moved Away," "The Last Good Country," and "Wedding Day."

Images

See also
Birthplace of Ernest Hemingway
Ernest and Mary Hemingway House, Ketchum, Idaho
Ernest Hemingway House, Key West, Florida
List of National Historic Landmarks in Michigan
National Register of Historic Places listings in Emmet County, Michigan

References

National Historic Landmarks in Michigan
Houses on the National Register of Historic Places in Michigan
Houses in Emmet County, Michigan
Michigan State Historic Sites
Houses completed in 1900
Ernest Hemingway
National Register of Historic Places in Emmet County, Michigan
Hemingway, Ernest Cottage
Cottages